The Best Bang!! (stylized as THE BEST BANG!!) is Japanese rock singer-songwriter Masaharu Fukuyama's fourth compilation album, released on November 17, 2010. The compilation was an all-time greatest hits album, featuring Fukuyama's songs from both his time with record labels BMG Japan and Universal Music Japan.

The album was released in other Asian territories in March and April 2011. The album was re-released in Japan in April with an added disc, titled the Asia Limited Bang!! version, featuring With Special Guests: Fukuyama Masaharu Remake, a tribute album performed by South Korean musicians, sung in Korean. The tribute album was also released separately in territories outside Japan.

Background and development 

The compilation is a collection to celebrate Fukuyama's 20th anniversary since his debut as a musician in 1990. The album features material from 1990 through to 2010, spanning two record labels. Fukuyama personally chose the songs to appear on the album.

The compilation also featured new songs, such as the singles "Hatsukoi" and "Hotaru/Shōnen," and a single for the song "Kokoro Color (A Song for the Wonderful Year)" featuring three completely unpublished songs. On the limited edition CD+DVD version of the album, six instrumental compositions were added to the third disc, including the unpublished "Denderaryūba," which was performed at Fukuyama's 20th anniversary We're Bros. tour.

Three versions of the album were released: a CD+DVD limited edition version, a version limited to 15,000 copies that came with a special towel and a regular version. The DVD featured eight songs' music videos, including "Kokoro Color (A Song for the Wonderful Year)."

Cover artwork 

The cover artwork to the regular and special goods version of the album features a collage of 44 different pictures of Fukuyama, from infancy through to 2010. The CD+DVD version, however, features a photo taken in 1988 at 19, before Fukuyama's debut as a singer. The reverse side of the album features a 2010 recreation of the photo, with Fukuyama at age 41.

Chart reception 

The album debuted on its first day at number one on Oricon'''s albums charts, debuting at number one for the week, with 381,000 copies sold. This became his 8th number one album, and was the highest sales for a solo vocalist in Japan for 2010, as well as the highest sales for an album by a male soloist in five years, since Ken Hirai's Ken Hirai 10th Anniversary Complete Single Collection '95—'05 "Utabaka". Despite being released in November, The Best Bang!! was the 9th best sold album in 2010 in Japan. The Recording Industry Association of Japan (RIAJ) have certified the album as double platinum for a shipment of more than 500,000 copies.

The additional single "Kokoro Color (A Song for the Wonderful Year)" was released digitally as a full-length cellphone download a week before the album on November 10. The song was promoted heavily on radio for two weeks, peaking at number 7 on Billboard'' Japan Hot 100. The song reached number 13 on the RIAJ Digital Track Chart.

Track listing 

All versions of the album 

All songs written and composed by Masaharu Fukuyama, except "Tsuioku no Ame no Naka" which features additional music written with Hideo Sano, "Peach!!" which features music co-written with Motohiro Tomita and "Ishikure no Pride" which features lyrics by Sion.

Chart rankings

Sales and certifications

Release history

References

2010 compilation albums
Tribute albums
Masaharu Fukuyama albums
Japanese-language albums
Korean-language albums
Rock compilation albums